Kavaraipettai is a suburb in North Chennai, in the Tiruvallur district in the Indian state of Tamil Nadu.

Landmarks
The prime landmarks of the town include the Velammal Bodhi Campus, Velammal Knowledge Park at Ponneri High Road, Panchetti.

Transport 
Kavaraipettai is connected by road and rail networks. The major roads connecting Chennai and Kavaraipettai is the Chennai–Kolkata Highway Road. Kavaraipettai lies on National Highway 5. City buses run by the Metropolitan Transport Corporation (MTC) play an important role in transportation.

Cities and towns in Tiruvallur district